Gwen Leys Davenport ( – ) was an American comic novelist.  

She graduated from Vassar College in 1931. In 1937, she married stockbroker John Davenport and they settled in his hometown of Louisville, Kentucky. They had three children.

She is best known for the comic novel Belvedere (1947), about a snooty English housekeeper named Lynn Belvedere who goes to work for an American family.  It inspired a trio of films starring Clifton Webb - Sitting Pretty (1948), Mr. Belvedere Goes to College (1949), and Mr. Belvedere Rings the Bell (1951) - and a television series starring Christopher Hewett, Mr. Belvedere (1985-1990). 

Gwen Davenport died on 23 March 2002 in Louisville.

Bibliography 

 A Stranger and Afraid, Bobbs-Merrill (New York, NY), 1943.
 Return Engagement, Bobbs-Merrill, 1946.
 Belvedere, Bobbs-Merrill, 1947.
 Family Fortunes, Doubleday, 1949.
 Candy for Breakfast, Doubleday, 1950.
 The Bachelor's Baby, Doubleday (Garden City, NY), 1958.
 The Tall Girl's Handbook, illustrated by Polly Bolian, Doubleday, 1959.
 The Wax Foundation, Doubleday, 1961.
 Great Loves in Legend and Life, F. Watts (New York, NY), 1964.
 Time and Chance, Donald I. Fine, 1993.

References 

Created via preloaddraft
1909 births
2002 deaths
American women novelists
Vassar College alumni